Brian Kent Kobilka (born May 30, 1955) is an American physiologist and a recipient of the 2012 Nobel Prize in Chemistry with Robert Lefkowitz for discoveries that reveal the workings of G protein-coupled receptors. He is currently a professor in the department of Molecular and Cellular Physiology at Stanford University School of Medicine.  He is also a co-founder of ConfometRx, a biotechnology company focusing on G protein-coupled receptors. He was named a member of the National Academy of Sciences in 2011.

Early life
Kobilka attended St. Mary's Grade School in Little Falls, Minnesota, a part of the Roman Catholic Diocese of Saint Cloud. He then graduated from Little Falls High School. He received a Bachelor’s Degree in Biology and Chemistry from the University of Minnesota Duluth, and earned his M.D., cum laude, from Yale University School of Medicine. Following the completion of his residency in internal medicine at Washington University in St. Louis School of Medicine's Barnes-Jewish Hospital. Kobilka worked in research as a postdoctoral fellow under Robert Lefkowitz at Duke University, where he started work on cloning the β2-adrenergic receptor. Kobilka moved to Stanford in 1989. He was a Howard Hughes Medical Institute (HHMI) investigator from 1987 to 2003.

Research

Kobilka is best known for his research on the structure and activity of G protein-coupled receptors (GPCRs); in particular, work from Kobilka's laboratory determined the molecular structure of the β2-adrenergic receptor. This work has been highly cited by other scientists because GPCRs are important targets for pharmaceutical therapeutics, but notoriously difficult to work with in X-ray crystallography. Before, rhodopsin was the only G-protein coupled receptor where the structure had been determined at high resolution. The β2-adrenergic receptor structure was soon followed by the determination of the molecular structure of several other G-protein coupled receptors.

Kobilka is the 1994 recipient of the American Society for Pharmacology and Experimental Therapeutics John J. Abel Award in Pharmacology. His GPCR structure work was named "runner-up" for the 2007 "Breakthrough of the Year" award from Science. The work was, in part, supported by Kobilka's 2004 Javits Neuroscience Investigator Award from the National Institute of Neurological Disorders and Stroke. He received the 2012 Nobel Prize in Chemistry with Robert Lefkowitz for his work on G protein-coupled receptors. In 2017, Kobilka received the Golden Plate Award of the American Academy of Achievement.

As part of Shenzhen’s 13th Five-Year Plan funding research in emerging technologies and opening "Nobel laureate research labs", in 2017 he opened the Kobilka Institute of Innovative Drug Discovery at the CUHK Shenzhen campus in Southern China.

Personal life
Kobilka is from Little Falls in central Minnesota. Both his grandfather Felix J. Kobilka (1893–1991) and his father Franklyn A. Kobilka (1921–2004) were bakers and natives of Little Falls, Minnesota. Kobilka's grandmother, Isabelle Susan Kobilka (née Medved, 1891–1980), belonged to the Medved and Kiewel families of Prussian immigrants, who from 1888 owned the historical Kiewel brewery in Little Falls. His mother is Betty L. Kobilka (née Faust, b. 1930).

Kobilka met his wife Tong Sun Thian, a Malaysian-Chinese woman, at the University of Minnesota Duluth. They have two children, Jason and Megan Kobilka.

References

Publications

External links
 Kobilka laboratory home page
 Brian Kobilka academic profile 
 ConfometRx home page
 

1955 births
Living people
American Nobel laureates
American physiologists
American biophysicists
American Roman Catholics
American crystallographers
Members of the United States National Academy of Sciences
Nobel laureates in Chemistry
People from Little Falls, Minnesota
Physicians from Minnesota
Duke University faculty
Stanford University School of Medicine faculty
Howard Hughes Medical Investigators
University of Minnesota Duluth alumni
Yale School of Medicine alumni
Nobel laureates affiliated with Missouri
Fellows of the American Society for Pharmacology and Experimental Therapeutics
Washington University School of Medicine people